Leonie Reisberg is an Australian photographer.

Biography
Leonie Reisberg was born in 1955 in Melbourne, and studied Photography at R.M.I.T. for 2 years then at Prahran College of Advanced Education for a further 2 years. After teaching for a year, she went to U.S. to study for her Master of Fine Arts at the School of the Art Institute of Chicago.

In 1978 Reisberg returned to Melbourne to work as a graphic designer before moving to Adelaide in 1979 where she took up a lectureship in Photography at Torrens College. In 1982 the Visual Arts Board of the Australia Council granted her a participation fee through their regional development program for a national touring exhibition conducted over 1981-2.

Reisberg continued to exhibit nationally and internationally into the 1990s and has works in major collections in Australia and overseas.

Exhibitions 
 1976, September 7–24; Victorian College of the Arts Gallery, Melbourne
 1980, March; Nuance, Adelaide Festival 
 1981, September 17-October 11; Here there and back again: Leonie Reisberg and recent works by Cartier-Bresson, The Developed Image, Adelaide
 1981-1982; touring exhibition in regional galleries from Mount Gambier in South Australia to Darwin in the Northern Territory
 1982, 13 Oct–3 Nov; Leonie Reisberg Photo collage, Roslyn Oxley9 Gallery, Sydney
 1983; National Photographic Exhibition, Albury Regional Art Centre. Artists: Ann Balla, Ingrid Borberg, Kate Breakey, Kathie Crawford, Alan Cruikshank, Ed Douglas, Max Dupain, Peter Elliston, Nina Girling, Mark Kimber, Merryle Johnson, Ron McCormick, Danny McDonald, Chris Meadham, Trevor Peters, Philip Quirk, Leonie Reisberg, Miriam Stannage, Mark Strizic, Allan Vizents, Richard Woldendorp.
 1983; Australie: re-constructed vision : oeuvres contemporaines avec photographies Exhibition created by the Art Gallery of New South Wales, Sydney, and the Australia Council for the Festival d'Automne, Paris. Artists: Christine Godden, Fiona Hall, Douglas Holleley, Mike Parr, Leonie Reisberg, Lynn Silverman, John Williams, Micky Allen, Warren Breninger, Peter Charuk
 1981; exhibition in conjunction with the experimental theatre piece Basketweaving for amateurs at Bouverie Street, Carlton
 1997; Flatlands: photography and everyday space, Art Gallery of New South Wales, Sydney
2014, 1 February to 30 March; Wildcards: Bill Henson Shuffles The Deck, Monash Gallery of Art

Collections 
 National Gallery of Australia
National Library of Australia
 Art Gallery of South Australia
 National Gallery of Victoria
 Art Gallery of New South Wales
 Polaroid collection, Museum of Photography WestLicht
 Art Institute of Chicago
Centre for Contemporary Photography, University of Arizona

References

1955 births
Living people
20th-century Australian women artists
21st-century Australian women artists
Artists from Melbourne 
Australian photographers
Australian women photographers
School of the Art Institute of Chicago alumni